Leung Ka Ming (born 19 December 1988, Hong Kong) is a Hong Kong fencer. At the 2012 Summer Olympics, he competed in the Men's épée but was defeated in the first round by Paolo Pizzo.

References

Hong Kong male épée fencers
Living people
Olympic fencers of Hong Kong
Fencers at the 2012 Summer Olympics
Fencers at the 2010 Asian Games
Fencers at the 2014 Asian Games
1988 births
Asian Games competitors for Hong Kong